Glasgow St. Rollox was a burgh constituency represented in the House of Commons of the Parliament of the United Kingdom from 1885 until 1950. It elected one Member of Parliament (MP) using the first-past-the-post voting system.

The constituency covered Glasgow's Cowcaddens and Woodside wards.   In 1950, the constituency was extended to include North Kelvin ward, and the name was changed to Glasgow Woodside.

It is referenced in Franz Ferdinand's song "The Fallen" as an area where the protagonist of the story spends much of his time.

Boundaries 

The Redistribution of Seats Act 1885 provided that the constituency was to consist of the Fifth Municipal Ward, and the Third Municipal Ward, except so much as is comprised in the Camlachie Division.

In 1918 the constituency consisted of "That portion of the city which is bounded by a line commencing at a point at the intersection of Springburn Road and Parliamentary Road, thence south-westward along the centre line of Parliamentary Road to the centre line of Buchanan Street, thence northward along the centre line of Buchanan Street to the centre line of Cowcaddens, thence northwestward along the centre line of Cowcaddens, New City Road and Great Western Road to the centre line of the River Kelvin, thence northward along the centre line of the River Kelvin to the centre line of Belmont Street, thence northeastward along the centre line of Belmont Street to the centre line of Carlton Gardens, thence eastward along the centre line of Carlton Gardens and Raeberry Street to the centre line of New City Road, thence north-eastward along the centre line of Well Road and continuation thereof to the centre line of the Forth and Clyde Canal, thence south-eastward along the centre line of the Forth and Clyde Canal to the centre line of Possil Road, thence north-eastward along the centre line of Possil Road to the centre line of Saracen Street, thence eastward and north-eastward along the centre line of Keppochhill Road to the centre of the North British Railway (Edinburgh and Glasgow Line), thence south-westward along the centre line of the said North British Railway to the centre line of Fountainwell Road, thence south-eastward along the centre line of Fountainwell Road to the centre line of Springburn Road, thence southward along the centre line of Springburn Road to the point of commencement."

Members of Parliament

Election results

Elections in the 1880s

Elections in the 1890s

Elections in the 1900s

Elections in the 1910s

Elections in the 1920s

Elections in the 1930s

Elections in the 1940s

References 

Historic parliamentary constituencies in Scotland (Westminster)
Constituencies of the Parliament of the United Kingdom established in 1885
Constituencies of the Parliament of the United Kingdom disestablished in 1950
Politics of Glasgow
Springburn